KKT may refer to:

 Karush–Kuhn–Tucker conditions, in mathematical optimization of nonlinear programming
 kkt, a type of general partnership in Hungary
 Koi language, of Nepal, by ISO 639-3 code
 Kappa Kappa Tau, a fictional sorority in the television series Scream Queens
 Kumamoto Kenmin Televisions, a Japanese TV station